The genome of a female Hereford cow was published in 2009. It was sequenced by the Bovine Genome Sequencing and Analysis Consortium, a team of researchers led by the National Institutes of Health and the U.S. Department of Agriculture. It was part of an effort to improve livestock breeding and at the time was one of the largest genomes ever sequenced.

Genome 
The size of the bovine genome is 3 Gb (3 billion base pairs). It contains approximately 22,000 genes of which 14,000 are common to all mammalian species. Bovines share 80 percent of their genes with humans; cows are less similar to humans than rodents (humans and rodents belong to the clade of  Supraprimates) and dogs (humans and dogs belong to the clade of Boreoeutheria). They also have about 1,000 genes shared with dogs and rodents but not identified in humans. 

The charting of key DNA differences, also known as haplotypes, between several varieties of cattle could allow scientists to understand what is the role of some genes coding for products of economic value (milk, meat, leather). It opens new perspectives for enhancing selective breeding and changing certain cattle characteristics for the benefit of farmers.

Team 
The Bovine Genome Sequencing and Analysis Consortium worked to sequence the genome over a six-year period, and included 300 scientists across 25 countries led by the U.S. NIH and the USDA.

See also
 Cattle
 Hereford cattle
 DNA
 Genome
 International HapMap Project
 List of sequenced eukaryotic genomes
 Composite SINE transposons in the bovine genome
 Bovine genome database

References

External links
 Science Magazine, 24 April 2009, Vol 324, Issue 5926, Pages 435-537.
 Science Podcast, 04/24/09
   
   
  
  
  
View the cow genome on Ensembl

Hereford cattle
Genome projects